The 2010–11 Guadalajara season was the 64th professional season of Mexico's top-flight football league. The season is split into two tournaments—the Torneo Apertura and the Torneo Clausura—each with identical formats and each contested by the same eighteen teams. Guadalajara will begin their season on July 24, 2010, against Puebla, Guadalajara will play their homes games on Saturdays at 7:00pm local time.

Squad 
As of April 24, 2010.

(Captain)

(Vice-Captain)

Apertura 2010 results

Regular season

Goalscorers

Transfers

In

Out

Results

Results summary

Results by round

Tornero Clausura

Squad

Out on loan

Regular season

Final phase 

Guadalajara won 4–2 on aggregate

UNAM won 3–1 on aggregate

Friendlies

Goalscorers

Results

Results summary

Results by round

References 

2010–11 Primera División de México season
Mexican football clubs 2010–11 season